Thomas Brentnall (30 December 1846 – 10 July 1937) was an English-born chartered accountant who was the first president of the Institute of Chartered Accountants in Australia.

Early life and background 
He was the nephew of Thomas Brentnall, the 9th Mayor of Middlesbrough (1862). He matriculated at the University of Durham.

Accountancy in Australia 

His successful business evolved with several names, Brentnall & Riley, Brentnall, Norton & Co., and Brentnall, Mewton & Butler. From 1880, he lived at Newnham, Caroline Street, in South Yarra.

Other interests 
Brentnall was a keen musician and most notably a violinist and often performed in Melbourne.

Death 
His wife, Caroline Brentnall (née Crossley) died in 1909.

References

Bibliography 
A. D. Ellis, The History of the Royal Melbourne Golf Club (Melbourne, 1941); Chartered Accountant in Australia, July 1937; Argus (Melbourne), 30 December 1935; Sun-News Pictorial (Melbourne), 12 July 1937.

External links and sources 
Australian Dictionary of Biography

Australian accountants
English accountants
English emigrants to Australia
1846 births
1937 deaths
Alumni of Durham University
People from Melbourne